

Events
In an early work, Bertran d'Alamanon criticises the oppressive behaviour of Raymond Berengar IV of Provence towards his subjects when he has made Crusader vows.
Guilhem de la Tor composes  on the death of Giovanna d'Este in November. The poet himself is never mentioned again.

Births

Deaths

13th-century poetry
Poetry